Plano Christian Academy (PCA) was a private, Classical, non-denominational Christian school supporting grades K-12. Located in Plano, Texas, PCA utilized the Trivium, a three-stage integrative and cyclical approach to learning that introduces students to many of the influential works that shaped Western civilization.

History 

PCA was first conceived as a private Christian-based educational solution for athletes and artists requiring specialized scheduling. As plans for PCA developed, the board of trustees decided to open enrollment to non-athlete, non-artist students during its inaugural year. With this expansion, the board decided that PCA would be a Christian school with smaller classes (10:1 maximum), block scheduling, shorter hours, spiritual development, and individual attention. PCA opened its doors on the campus of the University of Gymnastics (Plano, TX) in August, 2003 with a student body of 19 in grades 4–11. It also took in students from the East Plano Christian Academy that was opened from 1986-2003.

Enrollment increased to 45 students by August, 2004. During the 2004-05 school year, PCA developed a long term vision to be a prominent school in the Dallas/Fort Worth area. With this in mind, the school transitioned to a Classical model of education and secured new facilities on the campus of the First Christian Church of Plano. PCA began its third year (August, 2005) with an enrollment of 60 students supporting grades 1–12.

The school's doors were closed in the spring of 2010.

Sources 
 Archived version of www.planochristianacademy.com
Plano Christian Academy Handbook: 2006-2007, (Plano, TX: Plano Christian Academy, 2006).

External links

 

Christian schools in Texas
Defunct schools in Texas
Private K-12 schools in Texas
Defunct Christian schools in the United States
Educational institutions established in 2003
2003 establishments in Texas
Classical Christian schools
High schools in Plano, Texas
Educational institutions disestablished in 2010
2010 disestablishments in Texas